Tobias acid (2-amino-1-naphthalenesulfonic acid) is an organic compound with the formula C10H6(SO3H)(NH2). It is named after the German chemist Georg Tobias. It is one of several aminonaphthalenesulfonic acids, which are derivatives of naphthalene containing both amine and sulfonic acid functional groups. It is a white solid, although commercial samples can appear otherwise. It is used in the synthesis of azo dyes such as C.I. Acid Yellow 19 and C.I. Pigment Red 49.  It is prepared via the Bucherer reaction of 2-hydroxynaphthalene-1-sulfonic acid with ammonia and ammonium sulfite.

References

External links
 2-Amino-1-naphthalenesulfonic acid, NIST Standard Reference Data Program

Naphthylamines
Sulfonic acids